Dick & Dom in da Bungalow is a British children's television series presented by the duo Dick and Dom (Richard McCourt and Dominic Wood). The series was broadcast on weekend mornings on various BBC television channels for five series, running between 31 August 2002 and 11 March 2006.

Creation
McCourt and Wood met whilst presenting CBBC's The Broom Cupboard, and were invited to create a new Saturday morning show to air on CBBC's new digital channel after establishing themselves as a double act. The name in da Bungalow was suggested by the BBC as a parody of Ali G Indahouse, and aired directly against SM:TV Live with H and Claire from Steps, and The Saturday Show on BBC One with Fearne Cotton and Simon Grant. After six months, da Bungalow had half a million viewers and moved to BBC One in 2003.

Show format
Much of the programme revolved around a loose game show format involving six studio contestants (or Bungalow Heads). These were all children in Series 1–4, whilst in Series 5, five children and one celebrity were the contestants on the Saturday show, and five children and a special guest ranging from family members / friends, or the cast of the show in various outfits (such as Darth Vader, or Mr. Blobby) were contestants on the Sunday show. Points were earned through success in various games throughout the show, although points could be awarded or taken away at any time by the hosts. Although they threatened to do this, for example, when a particular child was being troublesome, this was mostly never carried out.

The first and second prizes were usually desirable items such as a TV or games console, but the third prize was always a 'booby prize' like a hubcap, a cake made of carpet, a hairy cheese, bottled water from the River Hull or a chocolate tea pot. At the very end, the Bungalow Head with the fewest points was gunged, sitting on the toilet - though for the last series this practice was largely dropped, possibly because the contestants were already covered in "creamy muck muck" (custard) during the finale round.

The show's games were interspersed with random features and cartoons.

During Series 1 to 4, the points total at the end of Saturday - with an extra prize for the winner on Saturday - was carried over to the Sunday show, and prizes were awarded at the end of that show.

Recurring features

Bogies
The most infamous part of Dick and Dom in da Bungalow was a pre-recorded game called Bogies. In this game, Dick and Dom situated themselves in a quiet public place such as a museum or restaurant and took turns to shout "bogies" at gradually increasing volumes, until one of them did not shout as loud as the other (judged by a meter on the screen), or quit due to embarrassment.

The commentary for Bogies was provided by the show's producer, Steve Ryde.

Diddy Dick and Dom
Diddy Dick and Dom was a segment in which miniature versions of Dick and Dom (in reality, puppets attached to a black cloak) presented a mini sketch during an intermission of the show. The location for these sketches was in a purple cupboard, and away from the attention of Dick, Dom and the Bungalow Heads, the doors would open to show the duo. These were pre-recorded, and no more than a minute in length. Both Diddy Dick and Diddy Dom spoke with very squeaky voices, edited in post production. The sketches involving Diddy Dick and Diddy Dom tended to be either slapstick humour, puns or, more often than not, toilet humour.

In 2007, a series of 3-4 minute compilations of the sketches were made and shown on CBBC.

Cartoons
Every episode would have anywhere up to two to three cartoons shown throughout the show, including but not limited to the following.

 The Fairly OddParents
 Batfink
 Yvon of the Yukon
 Tom and Jerry Kids
 Watch My Chops
 Looney Tunes cartoons
 The New Scooby and Scrappy-Doo Show
 Taz Mania
 The Cramp Twins
 BB3B
 Zombie Hotel

Controversies
The BBC upheld a complaint in August 2004 against Wood and McCourt appearing nearly naked in promotions for the show on the CBBC Channel, deeming the material as beyond acceptable standards.

In September 2004, Ofcom said that the show breached children's programming regulations when Dominic Wood wore a t-shirt with the wording "Morning Wood", a slang term for erections. He said that it was merely a reference to the morning timeslot and his surname. The BBC said that its producers made an error in not objecting to the shirt.

Peter Luff, a Conservative MP, attacked the programme and its website for scatological content and criticised the role of the BBC as a public broadcaster of such content. The BBC responded that the show was entertainment for children 8-12 and was well-liked by that demographic, but may not appeal to adults. Luff's comments were subsequently parodied on the show in a segment titled 'Question Muck', inspired by the long running topical debate programme 'Question Time' based in the UK, where their panel of fake guests included a ball of fluff called 'Rt Hon. Pieceof Fluff MP'.

Transmissions

"No celebrities allowed" rule
The main rule of "da Bungalow" for most of its run was that there were no celebrities allowed, except for Comic Relief and the final series.

For the final series, however, this rule was changed, and five Bungalow Heads were joined by a Celebrity Bungalow Head. The first celebrity to enter the Bungalow was Rachel Stevens, who refused to take part in the show's Creamy Muck Muck finale, Muckversity Challenge. Reports at the time suggested that the presenters have banned Stevens from any live broadcast they do in the future.

Accolades

Spin-offs

Diddy Dick and Dom on CBBC
Short five-minute compilations of the Diddy Dick and Dom sketches were aired as filler programmes on BBC Two and the CBBC Channel after the programme's end.

Da Dick and Dom Dairies

A new series of compilations began airing during weekday mornings on BBC2 from Monday 26 January to Friday 20 February 2009 featuring newly recorded material from the original cast and the creamy muck muck finale towards the end of each episode. Regular segments included:
 Game or No Game in which Little Noely (a parody of Noel Edmonds played by Ian Kirkby who appeared in the Bungalow on two occasions) presents a parody of Deal or No Deal in order to determine whether or not a game will be shown or not. Little Noely invited viewers to pick one of two boxes. We are led to believe that if the "No Game" box is picked the show will end. If the "Game" box is picked the name of the game shown in the box is played.
 Good Game Good Game Gamey Game Game in which parodies of Bruce Forsyth and Tess Daly pick random cards each enlisting a game until a pair is found. The game which is the subject of the pair is subsequently shown, after "Bruce" says "What do we do with a pair?" and "Tess" says something like "Eat it!" (referring to the fruit). For some reason in this feature Tess Daly is just a mini spinning cardboard cut out which talks with a gruff northern accent.
 Batt Files in which Harry Batt interrogates former Bungalow Heads and relives classic Bungalow moments. The Prize Idiot also features who we are now told is a Police Constable working for DI Batt.
 Good Bungalows Go Bad - Melvin O Doom features in a sketch in which he relives some of his personal favourite Bungalow moments.

Notice the deliberate spelling mistake in the title (Dairies-Diaries), which is pointed out in the final episode of Da Dick and Dom Dairies.

Diddy TV

In 2016, another new series aired on CBBC which was a sketch show featuring parodies of various other programmes. It ran for four seasons.

Future & 20th Anniversary Tour
In 2016, producer Steve Ryde has stated that there may be a one-off special in the future.

On 14 November 2019, Dick and Dom ran a poll on Twitter asking if viewers would be interested to see a revival of the show, except with adults as contestants.

Tour

On 26 January 2022, Dick and Dom posted an image of one of the Bungalow's wallpapers on Instagram, with no context. Social media users theorized that this could signify a reboot. On 3 May 2022 Dick and Dom posted on their social media pages a video of the Bungalow house logo with the number 5 next to it and with Dick's voice shouting bogies. Over the next few hours, other videos were posted to create a countdown. On 4 May 2022, it was announced that Dick and Dom in Da Bungalow would be returning as a tour in Autumn 2022 to mark the show's 20th Anniversary. The tour was delayed to 2023 with added venues across the UK. The tour officially commenced on 11th March 2023 in the Birmingham Town Hall.

References

External links
 
 Dick and Dom in da Bungalow at Saturday Mornings
 

CBBC shows
BBC children's television shows
2000s British children's television series
2002 British television series debuts
2006 British television series endings
British television shows featuring puppetry
Television series featuring gunge